The American robin (Turdus migratorius) is a migratory bird of the true thrush genus and Turdidae, the wider thrush family. It is named after the European robin because of its reddish-orange breast, though the two species are not closely related, with the European robin belonging to the Old World flycatcher family. The American robin is widely distributed throughout North America, wintering from southern Canada to central Mexico and along the Pacific Coast. It is the state bird of Connecticut, Michigan, and Wisconsin.

According to the Partners in Flight database (2019), the American robin is the most abundant bird in North America (with 370,000,000 individuals), ahead of red-winged blackbirds, introduced European starlings, mourning doves and house finches. It has seven subspecies, but only one of them, the San Lucas robin (T. m. confinis) of Baja California Sur, is particularly distinctive, with pale gray-brown underparts.

The American robin is active mostly during the day and assembles in large flocks at night. Its diet consists of invertebrates (such as beetle grubs, earthworms, and caterpillars), fruits, and berries. It is one of the earliest bird species to lay its eggs, beginning to breed shortly after returning to its summer range from its winter range. The robin's nest consists of long coarse grass, twigs, paper, and feathers, and is smeared with mud and often cushioned with grass or other soft materials. It is among the earliest birds to sing at dawn, and its song consists of several discrete units that are repeated.

The adult robin's main predator is the domestic cat; other predators include hawks and snakes. When feeding in flocks, it can be vigilant, watching other birds for reactions to predators. Brown-headed cowbirds (Molothrus ater) lay their eggs in robin nests (see brood parasite), but the robins usually reject the egg.

Taxonomy 
This species was first described in 1766  by Carl Linnaeus in the twelfth edition of his Systema Naturae as Turdus migratorius. The term  for this species has been recorded since at least 1703. There are about 65 species of medium to large thrushes in the genus Turdus, characterized by rounded heads, longish pointed wings, and usually melodious songs.

A study of the mitochondrial cytochrome b gene indicates that the American robin is not part of the Central/South American clade of Turdus thrushes; instead it shows genetic similarities to the Kurrichane thrush (T. libonyanus) and the olive thrush (T. olivaceus), both African species. This conflicts with a 2007 DNA study of 60 of 65 Turdus species, which places the American robin's closest relative as the rufous-collared thrush (T. rufitorques) of Central America. Though having distinct plumage, the two species are similar in vocalization and behavior. Beyond this, it lies in a small group of four species of otherwise Central American distribution, suggesting it recently spread northwards into North America.

Seven subspecies of American robin are recognized. These subspecies intergrade with each other and are only weakly defined.
 The eastern robin (T. m. migratorius), the nominate subspecies, breeds in the U.S. and Canada, other than down the West Coast, to the edge of the tundra from Alaska and northern Canada east to New England and then south to Maryland, northwestern Virginia, and North Carolina. It winters in southern coastal Alaska, southern Canada, most of the U.S., Bermuda, the Bahamas and eastern Mexico.
 The Newfoundland robin (T. m. nigrideus) breeds from coastal northern Quebec to Labrador and Newfoundland and winters from southern Newfoundland south through most of the eastern U.S. states to southern Louisiana, southern Mississippi and northern Georgia. It is uniformly darker or blackish on the head, with a dark gray back. The underparts are slightly redder than those of the eastern subspecies.
 The southern robin (T. m. achrusterus) breeds from southern Oklahoma east to Maryland and western Virginia and south to northern Florida and the Gulf Coast states. It winters through much of the southern part of the breeding range. It is smaller than the eastern subspecies. The black feathers of the forehead and crown have pale gray tips. The underparts are paler than those of the eastern subspecies.
 The northwestern robin (T. m. caurinus) breeds in southeastern Alaska through coastal British Columbia to Washington and northwestern Oregon. It winters from southwestern British Columbia south to central and southern California and east to northern Idaho. It is slightly smaller than the eastern subspecies and very dark-headed. The white on the tips of the outer two tail feathers is restricted.
 The western robin (T. m. propinquus) breeds from southeastern British Columbia, southern Alberta, and southwestern Saskatchewan south to southern California and northern Baja California. It winters throughout much of the southern breeding range and south to Baja California. It is the same size as, or slightly larger than, the eastern subspecies, but paler and tinged more heavily brownish-gray. It has very little white on the tip of the outermost tail feathers. Some birds, probably females, lack almost any red below. Males are usually darker and may show pale or whitish sides to the head.
 The San Lucas robin (T. m. confinis) breeds above  in the highlands of southern Baja California. This subspecies is particularly distinctive, with pale gray-brown underparts. It is relatively small, and the palest subspecies, with uniform pale gray-brown on the head, face and upperparts. It usually lacks any white spots to the tips of the outer tail feathers, which have white edges. It is sometimes classed as a separate species, but the American Ornithologists' Union regards it as only a subspecies, albeit in a different group from the other six subspecies.
 The Mexican robin (T. m. phillipsi) is resident in Mexico south to central Oaxaca. It is slightly smaller than the western subspecies, but has a larger bill; the male's underparts are less brick-red than the eastern subspecies and have a rustier tone.

Description 

The head varies from jet black to gray, with white eye arcs and white supercilia. The throat is white with black streaks, and the belly and undertail coverts are white. The American robin has a brown back and a reddish-orange breast, varying from a rich red maroon to peachy orange. The bill is mainly yellow with a variably dark tip, the dusky area becoming more extensive in winter, and the legs and feet are brown.

The sexes are similar, but the female tends to be duller than the male, with a brown tint to the head, brown upperparts and less-bright underparts. However, some birds cannot be accurately sexed on the sole basis of plumage. The juvenile is paler in color than the adult male and has dark spots on its breast, and whitish wing coverts. First-year birds are not easily distinguishable from adults, but they tend to be duller, and a small percentage retain a few juvenile wing coverts or other feathers.

Distribution and habitat 
This bird breeds throughout most of North America, from Alaska and Canada southward to northern Florida and Mexico. While robins occasionally overwinter in the northern part of the United States and southern Canada, most migrate to winter south of Canada from Florida and the Gulf Coast to central Mexico, as well as along the Pacific Coast. Most depart south by the end of August and begin to return north in February and March (exact dates vary with latitude and climate). The distance by which robins migrate varies significantly depending on their initial habitat; a study found that individual robins tagged in Alaska are known to travel as much as 3.5x further across seasons than robins tagged in Massachusetts.

This species is actually a rare vagrant to western Europe, where the majority of records, more than 20, have been in Great Britain. In the autumn of 2003, migration was displaced eastwards leading to massive movements through the eastern U.S., and presumably this is what led to no fewer than three American robins being found in Great Britain, with two attempting to overwinter in 2003–2004, although one was taken by a Eurasian sparrowhawk. A sighting occurred in Great Britain in January 2007. This species has also occurred as a vagrant to Greenland, Jamaica, Hispaniola, Puerto Rico and Belize. Vagrants to Europe, where identified to subspecies, are the eastern subspecies (T. m. migratorius), but the Greenland birds also included the Newfoundland subspecies (T. m. nigrideus), and some of the southern overshots may have been the southern subspecies (T. m. achrusterus).

The American robin's breeding habitat is woodland and more open farmland and urban areas. It becomes less common as a breeder in the southernmost part of the Deep South of the United States, and there prefers large shade trees on lawns. Its winter habitat is similar, but includes more open areas.

Disease 
The American robin is a known reservoir (carrier) for West Nile virus. While crows and jays are often the first noticed deaths in an area with West Nile virus, the American robin is suspected to be a key host, and holds a larger responsibility for the transmission of the virus to humans. This is because, while crows and jays die quickly from the virus, the American robin survives the virus longer, hence spreading it to more mosquitoes, which then transmit the virus to humans and other species.

Behavior 
The American robin is active mostly during the day, and on its winter grounds it assembles in large flocks at night to roost in trees in secluded swamps or dense vegetation. The flocks break up during the day when the birds feed on fruits and berries in smaller groups. During the summer, the American robin defends a breeding territory and is less social.

Diet 

The American robin's diet generally consists of around 40 percent small invertebrates (mainly insects), such as earthworms, beetle grubs, caterpillars and grasshoppers, and 60 percent wild and cultivated fruits and berries. Their ability to switch to berries allows them to winter much farther north than most other North American thrushes. They will flock to fermented Pyracantha berries, and after eating sufficient quantities will exhibit intoxicated behavior, such as falling over while walking. Robins forage primarily on the ground for soft-bodied invertebrates, and find worms by sight (and sometimes by hearing), pouncing on them and then pulling them up. Nestlings are fed mainly on earthworms and other soft-bodied animal prey. In some areas, robins, particularly of the northwestern subspecies (T. m. caurinus), will feed on beaches, taking insects and small mollusks. American robins are common pests of fruit orchards in North America. Due to their insectivorous and frugivorous diet they have evolved to lose sucrase. Brugger & Nelms 1991 find sucrose is unpalatable to them and can be used by humans as a deterrent.

The American robin uses auditory, visual, olfactory and possibly vibrotactile cues to find prey, but vision is the predominant mode of prey detection. It is frequently seen running across lawns picking up earthworms, and its running and stopping behavior is a distinguishing characteristic. In addition to hunting visually, it also has the ability to hunt by hearing. Experiments have discovered that it can find earthworms underground by simply using its listening skills. It typically will take several short hops and then cock its head left, right or forward to detect movement of its prey. In urban areas, robins will gather in numbers soon after lawns are mowed or where sprinklers are in use.

Threats 
Juvenile robins and eggs are preyed upon by squirrels, snakes, and some birds, such as blue jays, California scrub jays, Steller's jays, common grackles, American crows, and common ravens. Adults are primarily taken by Accipiter hawks, cats, and larger snakes (especially rat snakes and gopher snakes). Mammals, such as foxes and dogs, are mainly likely to grab fledgling young robins from the ground, while raccoons often prey upon nests and small carnivores such as American martens, ring-tailed cats and long-tailed weasels are agile enough to hunt adults. However, the greatest predatory impact (perhaps alongside domestic cats) is probably from raptorial birds. They may be taken by nearly every variety of North American accipitrid, from the smallest, the sharp-shinned hawk, to one of the two largest, the golden eagle, most every North American falcon from the smallest, the American kestrel, to the largest, the gyrfalcon, and almost all owl species from the northern pygmy owl to the snowy owl. Overall, 28 raptorial bird species are known to hunt American robins. Adult robins are most vulnerable when distracted by breeding activities, though they may also be attacked on the ground or even in flight. However, when feeding in flocks, the American robin is able to remain vigilant and watch other flock members for reactions to predators.

The American robin is known to be a rejecter of cowbird eggs, so brood parasitism by the brown-headed cowbird is rare. Even when it occurs, the parasite's chick does not normally survive to fledging. In a study of 105 juvenile robins, 77.1% were infected with one or more species of endoparasite, with Syngamus species the most commonly encountered, found in 57.1% of the birds.

Breeding 

The American robin begins to breed shortly after returning to its summer range. It is one of the first North American bird species to lay eggs, and normally has two to three broods per breeding season, which lasts from April to July.

The outer foundation consists of long coarse grass, twigs, paper, and feathers. This is lined with smeared mud and cushioned with fine grass or other soft materials. A new nest is built for each brood, and in northern areas the first clutch is usually placed in an evergreen tree or shrub, while later broods are placed in deciduous trees. The American robin does not shy away from nesting close to human habitations.

A clutch consists of three to five cyan eggs, and is incubated by the female alone. The eggs hatch after 14 days, and the chicks leave the nest a further two weeks later. The altricial chicks are naked and have their eyes closed for the first few days after hatching.

The chicks are fed earthworms, insects, and berries. Waste accumulation does not occur in the nest because the adults collect and take it away. Chicks are fed, and then raise tails for elimination of waste, a solid white clump that is collected by a parent prior to flying off. All chicks in the brood leave the nest within two days of each other. Juveniles become capable of sustained flight two weeks after fledging. Bird banders have found that only 25% of young robins survive their first year. The longest known lifespan of an American robin in the wild is 14 years; the average lifespan is about 2 years.

Vocalization 

The male American robin, as with many thrushes, has a complex and almost continuous song. It is commonly described as a cheery carol, made up of discrete units, often repeated, and spliced together into a string with brief pauses in between. The song varies regionally, and its style varies by the time of day. The song period is from late February or early March to late July or early August; some birds, particularly in the east, sing occasionally into September or later. They are often among the first songbirds to sing as dawn rises or hours before, and last as evening sets in. It usually sings from a high perch in a tree. The song of the San Lucas subspecies (T. m. confinis) is weaker than that of the eastern subspecies (T. m. migratorius), and lacks any clear notes.

The American robin also sings when storms approach and again when storms have passed. In addition to its song, the species has a number of calls used for communicating specific information, such as when a ground predator approaches and when a nest or another American robin is being directly threatened. Even during nesting season, when they exhibit mostly competitive and territorial behavior, they may still band together to drive away a predator.

Conservation status 
The western subspecies (T. m. propinquus) in central California are considered to be expanding their range, as is likely the case elsewhere in the United States. It is threatened by climate change and severe weather, but the population trend appears to be stable, and the species does not approach the vulnerable species thresholds under the population trend criterion (>30% decline over ten years or three generations), and therefore International Union for Conservation of Nature evaluated it as least concern.

At one point, the bird was killed for its meat, but it is now protected throughout its range in the United States by the Migratory Bird Treaty Act.

In culture 
Robin egg blue is a color named after the color of the bird's eggs.

The American robin is the state bird of Connecticut, Michigan, and Wisconsin. It was also depicted on the 1986 Birds of Canada series Canadian $2 note (this note was subsequently withdrawn.) It has a place in Native American mythology. The story of how the robin got its red breast by fanning the dying flames of a campfire to save a Native American man and a boy is similar to those that surround the European robin. The Tlingit people of northwestern North America held it to be a culture hero created by Raven to please the people with its song. The Peace Bridge robins were a family of American robins that attracted minor publicity in the mid-1930s for their prominent nest on the Canadian side of the Peace Bridge connecting Buffalo, New York, to Fort Erie, Ontario.

The American robin is considered a symbol of spring. A well-known example is a poem by Emily Dickinson titled "I Dreaded That First Robin So". Among other 19th-century poems about the first robin of spring is "The First Robin" by Dr. William H. Drummond, which according to the author's wife is based on a Quebec superstition that whoever sees the first robin of spring will have good luck. The association has continued down to the present day, as, for example, in one Calvin and Hobbes cartoon from 1990 that had Calvin celebrating his inevitable wealth and fame after seeing the first robin of spring. The harbinger of spring sobriquet is borne out by the fact that American robins tend to follow the  isotherm north in spring, but also south in fall.

American popular songs featuring this bird include "When the Red, Red Robin (Comes Bob, Bob, Bobbin' Along)", written by Harry M. Woods. Although the comic book superhero Robin was inspired by an N. C. Wyeth illustration of Robin Hood, a later version had his mother nicknaming him Robin because he was born on the first day of spring.

Gallery

See also 
 Australasian robins of the genus Petroica

References

External links 

 FieldGuide – eNature.com
 "Robins of a Different Feather" – albinism in robins
 Animal Facts – natural history, maps, and photos at the Washington Nature Mapping Program
 Vocalizations – Journey North
 
 Sound file – vivanatura.org
 Plans for nesting shelves – Journey North
 Nesting journal – Photo blog following the process from nest building to leaving the nest – Webster's Wobbins
 Florida bird sounds including the American robin – Florida Museum of Natural History
 American robin subspecies Turdus migratorius nigrideus (Aldrich and Nutt)
 American robin growth progress with date stamp
 

Articles containing video clips
Birds described in 1766
Birds of Canada
Birds of Mexico
Birds of North America
Birds of the United States
Extant Late Pleistocene first appearances
Fauna of the San Francisco Bay Area
Migratory birds (Western Hemisphere)
Native birds of Alaska
Symbols of Connecticut
Symbols of Michigan
Symbols of Wisconsin
Taxa named by Carl Linnaeus
Tool-using animals
Turdus